Psaphida grandis, the gray sallow, is a moth of the family Noctuidae. The species was first described by John Bernhardt Smith in 1898. It is found in North America from Ontario, south to Florida. It has been recorded from Iowa, New York, Maryland, South Carolina, Arkansas, Michigan and Wisconsin.

The wingspan is about 38 mm.

External links
Images
Moths of Maryland
Species report

Psaphida
Moths of North America
Moths described in 1898